Smith New Court Ltd v Scrimgeour Vickers (Asset Management) Ltd [1996] UKHL 3 is an English contract law case concerning misrepresentation. It illustrates the damages available for deceit.

Facts
An employee of Scrimgeour, Mr Roberts, fraudulently told Smith New Court that there were close rival bids for buying shares in Ferranti IS Inc. Smith bought £23.1m worth of shares. Ferranti then revealed it was a victim of a massive fraud (the ‘Guerin’ fraud, an American businessman had sold them a worthless company) and the share price fell considerably. Smith sold the shares for £11,788,204, a loss of £11,353,220. Smith then brought an action for deceit.

Judgment

Court of Appeal
The Court of Appeal awarded £1,196,010 in damages to reflect the difference between what was paid and the market value at the date of purchase.

House of Lords
Lord Browne-Wilkinson held that Smith New Court was entitled to the full loss of £11.3m. He laid down seven principles as follows:

(1) the defendant must make reparation from all damage coming directly from the transaction
(2) foreseeability is irrelevant
(3) the full price paid can be recovered, minus any benefits he received resulting from the transaction
(4) a general rule is that benefits include market price as at the date of acquisition, but this is not to be inflexible to prevent full compensation
(5) that general rule does normally not apply when misrepresentation continues to operate after acquisition, inducing the claimant to retain the asset, or the claimant is locked into holding the property by reason of the fraud
(6) consequential loss is recoverable...
(7) ...subject to mitigation once fraud is discovered.

Lord Steyn asked,

Lord Keith, Slynn and Mustill concurred.

See also

English contract law
Misrepresentation in English law
UK company law
South Australia Asset Management Corpn v York Montague Ltd [1997] AC 191, a negligence case where the scope of duty was restricted against responsibility for fall in the market price.

Notes

English misrepresentation case law
House of Lords cases
1996 in case law
1996 in British law
United Kingdom company case law